Willi Entenmann (25 September 1943 – 3 January 2012) was a German football coach and player.

Entenmann was born in Benningen am Neckar. As a coach in the Bundesliga, his highest finish was fifth place in 1986. He died, aged 68, in Garmisch-Partenkirchen.

Honours
As a coach
 DFB-Pokal finalist: 1985–86

References

External links
 

1943 births
2012 deaths
German footballers
German football managers
Bundesliga players
2. Bundesliga players
VfB Stuttgart players
VfB Stuttgart managers
1. FC Nürnberg managers
Bundesliga managers
SpVgg Unterhaching managers
VfR Aalen managers
SV Sandhausen managers
Association football midfielders
VfB Stuttgart II managers
Footballers from Baden-Württemberg